Amedeo D'Albora (10 January 1896 – 30 November 1980) was an Italian architect. His work was part of the architecture event in the art competition at the 1936 Summer Olympics.

References

External links
 

1896 births
1980 deaths
20th-century Italian architects
Olympic competitors in art competitions
19th-century Neapolitan people